Lithostege fissurata is a moth of the family Geometridae. It was described by Jules Paul Mabille in 1888. It is found from western Algeria to Libya, south-eastern Egypt and Israel and from Saudi Arabia to south-eastern Iran and southern Iraq. It is also found on Malta.

The wingspan is 19–28 mm. The ground colour of the forewings is cream. The hindwings are dirty white. Adults are on wing from early March to early May and from mid-February to mid-March.

Subspecies
Lithostege fissurata fissurata
Lithostege fissurata inanis Prout in Seitz, 1941 (Saudi Arabia to south-eastern Iran and southern Iraq)

References

External links
 Lithostege fissurata in lepidoptera catalog

Moths described in 1888
Chesiadini